Asli Naqli is a 1986 Hindi-language film directed by Sudarsan Nag. It stars Shatrughan Sinha and Rajinikanth with Anita Raj and Raadhika playing their female leads respectively. It was a box office  hit. The movie was dubbed in Tamil as Thaayin Meedhu Sabatham.

Plot
Seth Laxmi Narayan and his wife had a son who was separated at an early age. The only clue they have is that he has a locket around his neck. When Laxmi Narayan passes away, he leaves behind a lot of money and wealth. His wife makes efforts to locate her long-lost son, with the help of her relative, Durjan Singh. Durjan Singh hires a local thug, Birju, and asks him to pose as the long-lost son, for a hefty price, to which he agrees. Mrs. Narayan welcomes Birju as her son, and accepts him, little knowing his agenda, and the evil scheme devised by Durjan Singh and his son.

Cast
Shatrughan Sinha as Vijay
Rajinikanth as Birju Ustad
Anita Raj as Anita
Raadhika as Vijay's sister
Shakti Kapoor as Shakti Singh
Ashok Kumar as Driver / Chacha (uncle)
Amrish Puri as Durjan Singh
Beena Banerjee as Birju's mother
Rakesh Bedi as Sub-Insp. Chamanlal 
Bharat Bhushan as Priest
Seema Deo as Mrs. Laxmi Narayan (Anita's mother)
Goga Kapoor as Goga 
Satyen Kappu as Seth Laxmi Narayan
Gurbachchan Singh as Goga's man
Tiku Talsania as Tiku

Soundtrack
Music is composed by Laxmikant–Pyarelal, while all the songs are written by S.H. Bihari.

References

External links 

1986 films
1980s Hindi-language films
Films scored by Laxmikant–Pyarelal